The 1991 International League season took place from April to September 1991.

The Columbus Clippers defeated the Pawtucket Red Sox to win the league championship.

Attendance
Columbus Clippers - 606,371
Pawtucket Red Sox - 362,342
Richmond Braves - 434,994
Rochester Red Wings - 349,552
Scranton/Wilkes-Barre Red Barons - 546,533
Syracuse Chiefs - 307,993
Tidewater Tides - 203,261
Toledo Mud Hens - 229,419

Standings

Stats

Batting leaders

Pitching leaders

Regular season

Opening Day

All-Star game
The 1991 Triple-A All-Star Game was held at Cardinal Stadium in Louisville, Kentucky, home of the Louisville Redbirds of the American Association. The All-Stars representing the National League affiliates won 6-5. Steve Scarsone of the Scranton/Wilkes-Barre Red Barons was given the top award for the International League.

Playoffs

References

External links
International League official website 

 
International League seasons